Trenord is a railway company which is responsible for the operation of regional passenger trains in Lombardy. The company was established by the two main railway companies in Lombardy, Trenitalia and Ferrovie Nord Milano (FNM), to manage train operations in the region. The equity is equally divided between the two companies.

History

Trenitalia LeNord (TLN) was founded in Milan on 4 August 2009 from the merging of LeNord, company owned by FNM, and the Lombardy regional division of Trenitalia.

The first step of the new company was the opening of a new maintenance and cleaning center for trains in Lombardy, the biggest in Italy.

Trenitalia and LeNord rented their Lombardy regional trains divisions to the company on 30 October 2009 for 11 months. 
After this trial period the rent was extended to the end of 2010. After this date, the rent was again extended twice to 31 March and finally to 1 May 2011, when the company was renamed Trenord. 

The last agreement included also the Trenitalia control over TiLo and the EuroCity service by LeNord in partnership with Deutsche Bahn and ÖBB, all merged into the new company.

Routes 
Trenord inherited Trenitalia and LeNord operations in Lombardy. It therefore operates 42 regional lines, 12 suburban lines, the Malpensa Express and co-operates the EuroCity in Italy in cooperation with Deutsche Bahn and Österreichische Bundesbahnen.
The infrastructure is owned by Rete Ferroviaria Italiana (RFI) and Ferrovienord.

Milan suburban railway lines

Regional lines

Rolling stock
The company's rolling stock comprises 1850 items, inherited from Trenitalia regional division and from LeNord.

As of May 2011, the Trenord rolling stock comprises:

 Electric locomotives:
 E.464.

 Diesel locomotives:
 FNM Class De.520.
 Multiple units:
 Media Distanza con Vestiboli Centrali (MDVC);
 Carrozza vicinale a piano ribassato;
 Convoglio Servizio Aeroportuale (CSA);
 FS Class ALe 582;
 E 750 (no longer in use).
 Railcars:
 ALn 668;
 ATR125.
 Rail carriages:

 Double deck carriages;
 Vivalto;
 Treno Servizio Regionale (TSR);
 Treno ad alta frequentazione (TAF).

As of early 2011, Trenord has started to replace some of the older rolling stocks (such as the Class ALn 668 railcar) with the newer Class ATR125. These newer trains include features such as through carriages, digital information display, air conditioning, and electronic door controls.

See also
Transport in Milan

References

External links 
 

Companies based in Milan
Ferrovie dello Stato Italiane
Railway companies established in 2009
Railway companies of Italy
2009 establishments in Italy